Gowthami Grandhalayam or Sri Gowthami Regional Library was started by poet and social reformer Nalam Krishna Rao in 1898 in Rajahmundry, Andhra Pradesh, India.

History 
Initially named Sri Veeresalingam library, since it was backed by the nationalist Kandukuri Veeresalingam Pantulu, it was housed in Nalam Choultry in Innispeta with a very small collection.

Around the same time Addanki Satyanarayana established the Vasuraya Library.

Andhra Desa Grandhalaya Sangham secretary Pathuri Nageswara Rao suggested merger of the two libraries to get regional status.

Following the advice of the elite in the city, the two libraries were merged and named as Gowthami Grandhalayam and registered under the Societies Registration Act, 1920. Vavilala Gopala Krishnaiah and AB Nageswara Rao were successful in getting regional status to the library. In 1979, the government took over the library. With the increase in collections the library moved to the Town Hall in Rajahmundry.

The library enjoyed the patronage of persons like Maharaja Vikram Deo Verma of Jeypore State, Raja Kanchumarthi Ramachandra Rao of Dharmavaram Estate, Chilakamarti Lakshmi Narasimham, Bhamidipati Kameswara Rao, Kasinathuni Nageswara Rao, Cattamanchi Ramalinga Reddy and Pathuri Nagabhushanam. It had the reputation of quenching the literary thirst of people from foreign origin as well.

Efforts 
Later land was bought at Lakshmivarapupeta and a rich landlord Kanchumarti Seetaramachandra Rao constructed a building in memory of his daughter Babayamma (one of the first women to complete matriculation in Rajahmundry) who died young. The Babayamma Hall, served as the library building until the 1970s and still exists, behind the new building. Kanchumarti Babayamma is the first women Municipal Councillor of Rajahmundry.

With a good collection of both Telugu and English classics, including old editions of Shakespeare, the library was first managed by a committee elected by select lifetime members.

Mahidhar Jaganmohan  Rao was the last secretary of the library under the committee.

Some of the rare books and manuscripts 
 Books from the 12th century
 First 1771 published copy of the Encyclopædia Britannica
 Col. Mackenzie (Telugu) manuscripts
 The 100 volumes of Gandhi’s words
 Writings on revolutionary Alluri Sitaramaraju at the IIC
 Silver coated stylus for writing on palm leaves
 Copper plates
 Palm leaf manuscripts
 15,000 rare books. Of them, 1,500 books were published prior to 1900, around 8,115 books by 1923 and 5,000 books up to 1950.

Collection 
As of 2020, the library holds 1.10 lakh books, including 71,130 of Telugu, 21,974 of English, 7,967 of Hindi, 372 Urdu books, 667 other books, 411 palm leaf manuscripts, six copper plates and 40 unpublished manuscripts.

After the Tanjavur library in Tamil Nadu, the biggest in the region is Sri Gowthami Regional Library. By mid-2019, the construction of a new library building is scheduled to be completed.

References 

Libraries in Andhra Pradesh
Buildings and structures in Rajahmundry
1898 establishments in India
Libraries established in 1898
Education in East Godavari district